(The fair in Venice) is a three-act opera buffa, described as a , by Antonio Salieri, set to an Italian libretto by  (brother of the composer Luigi Boccherini).

Performance history

The opera premiered with great success on 29 January 1772 at the Burgtheater in Vienna.  turned out to be one of Salieri's best regarded works and during his lifetime was staged more than thirty times throughout Europe. In 1773, Mozart wrote fortepiano variations to the aria "Mio caro adone". In the movie Amadeus, Mozart called the aria, “a funny little tune but it yielded some good things”.

Roles

Recordings
Complete recording – Falsirena: Francesca Lombardi Mazzulli, Grifagno: Furio Zanasi,; Calloandra: Dilyara Idrisova, Ostrogoto: Krystian Adam, Cristallina: Natalia Rubiś, Rasojo: Emanuele D'Aguanno, Belfusto: Giorgio Caoduro; choir and Orchestra l'arte del mondo,  DHM 2CD 2019

References

External links
 
 Libretto, Munich Digitization Center

1772 operas
Opera buffa
Operas by Antonio Salieri
Italian-language operas
Operas set in Venice
Opera world premieres at the Burgtheater
Operas